William Snow (born 15 June 1960) is an Australian actor born in Sydney. He is most famous for his role as Lord John Roxton on the TV series Sir Arthur Conan Doyle's The Lost World. He is also known for his voice-over work on the Outback Steakhouse commercials.

Filmography

References

External links 
 

1960 births
Living people